Charles H. Keith was an American music publisher in Boston, Massachusetts in the 19th century. His business was located on Court Street from the 1840s to the 1850s. Among the songs published by his firm were "Old Dan Tucker" (1843), "Ole Bull and Old Dan Tucker" (1844), and "Dandy Jim ob Caroline" (1844).

References

External links

 Worldcat. Keith, Charles H.
 Worldcat. Keith's Music Publishing House

Businesspeople from Boston
American music publishers (people)
19th century in Boston
Cultural history of Boston
Government Center, Boston
19th-century American people
Year of death missing